The sixth season of the American television drama series Mad Men premiered on April 7, 2013, with a two-hour episode and concluded on June 23, 2013. It consisted of thirteen episodes, each running for approximately 48 minutes. AMC broadcast the sixth season on Sundays at 10:00 pm (ET) in the United States. The season premiered in the UK on Sky Atlantic on April 10, 2013. The sixth season was released on DVD and Blu-ray in region 1 on November 5, 2013. Season six takes place between December 1967 and November 1968, with characters struggling to adjust to the changing office dynamics based on the counterculture movement.

Cast

Main cast
Jon Hamm as Don Draper
Elisabeth Moss as Peggy Olson
Vincent Kartheiser as Pete Campbell
January Jones as Betty Francis
Christina Hendricks as Joan Harris
Aaron Staton as Ken Cosgrove
Rich Sommer as Harry Crane
Kiernan Shipka as Sally Draper
Jessica Paré as Megan Draper
Kevin Rahm as Ted Chaough
Christopher Stanley as Henry Francis
Jay R. Ferguson as Stan Rizzo
Ben Feldman as Michael Ginsberg
Mason Vale Cotton as Bobby Draper
Robert Morse as Bert Cooper
John Slattery as Roger Sterling

Recurring cast

Guest stars
Talia Balsam as Mona Sterling
Pamela Dunlap as Pauline Francis
Peyton List as Jane Sterling
Joe O'Connor as Tom Vogel
Julia Ormond as Marie Calvet
Danny Strong as Danny Siegel
Marten Holden Weiner as Glen Bishop
Ray Wise as Ed Baxter

Episodes

Production and writing
Matthew Weiner and the rest of the writers began work on the sixth season in July 2012. Principal photography for the sixth season began in October 2012. Cast members John Slattery and Jon Hamm each again directed episodes this season; Slattery directed two, while Hamm directed one episode. Slattery had previously directed three episodes for the series, while Hamm made his directorial debut in season five with the episode "Tea Leaves". The two-hour premiere had portions shot on-location in Hawaii. Weiner commented on the structure of the premiere, saying, "it's really constructed like a film. It is its own story and hopefully it foreshadows the rest of the season." Weiner said regarding the final 26 episodes of the series, "I can feel the end coming. I also felt like I'm not going to do 13 episodes of set-up; it should set itself up as it goes, as it always does." Executive producers and writing team Andre Jacquemetton and Maria Jacquemetton, the only writers besides Weiner to be on the writing staff for every season, departed the series after the conclusion of the sixth season to develop new projects.

Crew
Series creator Matthew Weiner also served as showrunner and executive producer, and is credited as a writer on 11 of the 13 episodes of the season, often co-writing the episodes with another writer. Erin Levy was promoted to producer and wrote two episodes. Semi Chellas was promoted to supervising producer and wrote two episodes. Janet Leahy was promoted to executive producer and wrote one episode. Writing team Andre Jacquemetton and Maria Jacquemetton continued as executive producers and co-wrote one episode together. Jonathan Igla was promoted to story editor and wrote one episode. New additions to the writing staff included co-producer Tom Smuts; staff writer Jason Grote and Carly Wray, who served as an assistant to the writers.

Scott Hornbacher, Michael Uppendahl, Jennifer Getzinger, John Slattery, and Phil Abraham each directed two episodes for the season. The remaining episodes were directed by cast member Jon Hamm, cinematographer Christopher Manley, and series creator Matthew Weiner, who directs each season finale.

Reception

Critical response
The sixth season of Mad Men received widespread critical acclaim. Review aggregator Rotten Tomatoes reports that 97% of 38 critics have given the season a positive review. The site's consensus is: "The passage of time has done little to dull Mad Men'''s rich cast of characters, who continue to confound." On Metacritic, the sixth season scored an 88 out of 100 based on 28 reviews, indicating "universal acclaim". 

David Hinckley of New York Daily News had high praise for the show's longevity, claiming that "While many shows that have reached this point in the road have left their creative peak behind, Mad Men shows no such erosion. It still has things it wants to say and it still has the poetry to say them well. With regard to the season's first episode, Tim Goodman of The Hollywood Reporter stated "What’s intriguing and partly amazing about the two hour "movie" called "The Doorway" that opens the season April 7 is that Weiner has not lost his touch at writing a beautifully crafted script—jammed with the sadness and humor and personal revelations we’ve all come to appreciate. But in addition to that, he's decided to really hit home Mad Men's key theme in the first two hours with a kind of ferocity of intent we’ve rarely seen from him." Jeff Jensen of Entertainment Weekly had a decidedly more mixed reaction, stating "Like Betty's frumpy frocks, Mad Men supersize episodes aren't flattering. Weiner should stick with tighter, denser storytelling packages. I hope he also delivers the season of change that the premiere seems to promise." Matt Zoller Seitz of Vulture says that "It's a clever, at times tricky season opener. In "Lost"-like style, it strategically withholds key information that would help us make immediate sense of Don's behavior, which by turns suggests a prisoner, a sleepwalker, and a ghost."

Jace Lacob of the Daily Beast stated that "Weiner is both archeologist and astronaut, and Season 6 of Mad Men is no exception, a beautifully realized and dazzling re-creation of our collective past and a glimpse of the infinite and unknowable." Alan Sepinwall of HitFix said "It continues to be one of the most satisfying dramas in the history of the medium." David Wiegland of the San Francisco Chronicle said that "Don Draper's journey has been and remains maddening, in a very good way as far as what makes a great TV show" and that "Like a great novel, Mad Men has character depths yet to plumb." In a rave review, Maureen Ryan of The Huffington Post'' stated that "The AMC drama is full of sharp writing, ambiguous segues, effective surprises and the usual array of pitch-perfect performances."

Accolades
For the 65th Primetime Emmy Awards, the sixth season received 12 nominations, including for Outstanding Drama Series, Jon Hamm for Outstanding Lead Actor in a Drama Series, Elisabeth Moss for Outstanding Lead Actress in a Drama Series, Christina Hendricks for Outstanding Supporting Actress in a Drama Series, Robert Morse and Harry Hamlin for Outstanding Guest Actor in a Drama Series, and Linda Cardellini for Outstanding Guest Actress in a Drama Series.

The season was nominated for Best Drama Series for the 2014 Writers Guild of America Awards.

References

External links
 

2013 American television seasons
 
Television series set in 1967
Television series set in 1968